Mariposa is an Indonesian teen drama comedy romance film directed by Fajar Bustomi, based on the 2018 novel of the same name by Luluk HF. The film stars Angga Yunanda, Adhisty Zara, Dannia Salsabilla, Abun Sungkar, and Junior Roberts and follows the live of new student Acha who falls for Iqbal, an over-archieving student who is torn between love and family pressure.

It was released on March 12, 2020, to positive reviews from critics and debuted with 140.000 audiences on its first day. Theaters are closed on March 23 theaters, following the COVID-19 outbreak in Indonesia, forcing Mariposa to stop its screening. On December 31, Mariposa was re-released and gained a total of 700.000 audiences.

The film was released on Netflix and KlikFilm on March 4, 2021.

Cast 
 Angga Yunanda as Iqbal Guanna Freedy
 Adhisty Zara as Natasha "Acha" Kay Loovy 
 Dannia Salsabila as Amanda
 Abun Sungkar as Rian
 Junior Roberts as Glen
 Syakir Daulay as Juna
 Irgi Fahrezi as Henry Kusuma
 Ariyo Wahab as Iqbaal's father
 Ersa Mayori as Kirana
 Baim sebagai Teddy
 Iszur Muchtar as Bambang

Spin-off and sequel 
In 2021, a spin-off film titled 12 Cerita Glen Anggara, also adapted from a novel of the same name by Luluk HF, focusing on Junior Robert's character Glen was announced with Junior himself, Angga Yunanda, Adhisty Zara, Dannia Salsabila, and Abun Sungkar reprising their roles. In addition, Prilly Latuconsina will portray Shena as the film's leading actress.

References

2020 films
Indonesian comedy-drama films
Films directed by Fajar Bustomi